CLIC or Clic can refer to:

Science and Technology 
 Chloride intracellular channel (a type of chloride channel, e.g. CLIC1)
 Clathrin-independent carrier (a subtype of endocytic membrane)
 Compact Linear Collider, a proposed particle accelerator at CERN

Music 
 Clic (album) an album by Italian experimental musician Franco Battiatio

Other 
 S4C Clic, a video on demand service from Welsh broadcaster S4C
 CLIC Sargent (now Young Lives vs Cancer), a cancer charity in the United Kingdom
 Cluster LInux pour le Calcul, is a special version of Mandrakelinux for computer clusters
CLiC (Colectivo de Livecoders), a livecoding collective from Argentina
 Community Leadership Independence Coalition, a party formed by Peter Lewis in the 2002 South Australian legislative election
 Company Level Intelligence Cell, a group of infantry Marines who form a small intelligence unit
 Cooperating Libraries in Consortium, a non-profit consortium of the libraries of eight private colleges and universities in Minneapolis–Saint Paul
 Programs organized by the Cumbria County Council:
 Cumbria Learning and Improvement Collaborative, an information resource for health and social workers
 Cumbria Libraries Interactive Catalogue, a county-wide public library catalogue system